Vighnesh Shivanand (born 27 March 1990), better known by his stage name Brodha V, is an Indian hip-hop artist, lyricist, rapper and music producer. Born in Kanchipuram, the Karnataka-based artist started rapping at the age of 18 and took part in online rap battles on Orkut. As an independent artist, Brodha V released a mixtape called Deathpunch which had a limited release and which garnered him some attention from the hip hop fraternity and the independent music circuit in South India.

Storypick called him "one of the best rappers in the country", and he was featured in ScoopWhoop's list of top ten Indian hip-hop artists who deserve more recognition. Rolling Stone India considers him part of "hip-hop's elite". The popularity he garnered led him to be signed by Sony Music India in 2013 and he released his single "Aigiri Nandini" under their banner. He has also collaborated with other artists in the Indian film industry such as KR$NA, Raghu Dixit, Vishal Dadlani, Benny Dayal, Raftaar and Anirudh Ravichander.

Career 
Brodha V's initial recognition came from active participation in "text battles" on Orkut, a social media network operated by Google. In 2008 Speed Ice and D'Brassic, two Delhi-based rappers, started a forum on Orkut called Insignia Rap Combat which helped found an online space for hip-hop artists to write rap battles. After using "Battle Communities" on Orkut to gain recognition and develop a personal style, Brodha V moved on to composing his own songs.

In 2008 he founded Machas With Attitude (MWA) with Smokey the Ghost and Big Nikk. They collaborated with Raghu Dixit and performed the rap portions in the song "Dheaon Dheaon" from the movie Mujhse Fraaandship Karoge. In 2013 the trio won the Radio City Freedom Award and met Vishal Dadlani, who offered to have them work on the film Chennai Express. This collaboration led them to compose the track "Ready Steady Po" for the film, which brought them further recognition in the music industry. The trio disbanded in 2013 to pursue independent careers.

As a solo artist, Brodha V released his first mix tape, Death Punch, in 2011 for a limited audience.  In 2012 his next single, "On My Own", was praised for its lyrical complexity and innate Indian quality. Gaining recognition, he released the singles "Aathma Raama" and "After Party" in 2012 and 2013 respectively. In 2013 Brodha V signed with Sony Music India. He next released his single "Aigiri Nandini". In 2015 he walked out on his contract with Sony Music, citing creative differences.

As a solo artist, Brodha V has worked with Anirudh Ravichander ("Why This Kolaveri Di" music director) for the song "Shake That," used in the score for Kaaki Sattai. Brodha V produced music for and rapped in "Anu Aunty – The Engineering Anthem", along with author, film maker and entrepreneur Varun Agarwal and stand-up comedians Sanjay Manaktala and Sumukhi Suresh, which parodied Iggy Azalea's "Fancy" and went viral on social media. With the intention of promoting hip-hop in India, Brodha V organized the first Indian rap cypher in Bangalore in 2014. Subsequent versions of the event were organized in Delhi and Mumbai. A rapper who changed the face of the Indian music scene, Brodha V has also been the inspiration for several prominent rappers to take up rap as a career, including DIVINE. In 2015 he collaborated with singer Benny Dayal to release the single "Round Round", which was listed as a top 10 track on Saavn. He has also produced music for jingles and anthems.

In 2017, Brodha V collaborated with artist Sanjeev Thomas on a campaign to raise awareness for Congenital Heart Defect using heartbeats donated by the public. In 2018, Brodha V stirred up controversy through his song "Shook Ones- Freestyle" by calling out artists who plagiarize content from other artists, and draws attention to the disparity in media attention given to artists from South India vs North India. In addition to performing shows across India, Brodha V was also invited to perform for the Music Matters festival in Singapore in 2018. As an ambassador for the cellphone brand OnePlus, Brodha V hosted and performed in the largest unboxing event conducted for the release of OnePlus 6T that set a Guinness World Record. 
Brodha V has also featured in the Bollywood movie Gully Boy directed by Zoya Akhtar, and he is one of the artists on whom the title and story were based upon. Brodha V's collaboration with Delhi-based rapper Raftaar shot him to fame in mainstream Hindi media in 2019. Brodha V has collaborated with athletic company Puma in 2019 to promote underground music and hip-hop culture in India. In 2019, Brodha V also released his first ever Kannada rap song, which was his rendition of the song "Maari Kannu" from the cult classic film A. In the music video that was well received by fans, he questions Indian society and asks everyone to introspect their values.

As a veteran in the Indian rap industry, Brodha V was a guest judge on the Indian rap reality TV show MTV Hustle where he also performed his latest single "Vaishnava Jana To" in the finale. In the socio-political anthem "Vaishnava Jana To" released in October 2019, Brodha V delivers his rendition of the Gandhian Bhajan using a unique boom bap sound. The song's lyrics, in line with Mahatma Gandhi's vision of peace and unity, talks about keeping aside differences and looking past religious and cultural backgrounds. Brodha V also released "Vainko", a collaboration with Bangalore-based YouTubers Jordindian, which instantly went viral and led to the "vainko challenge". In 2020, Brodha V released "Flex" that features Punjabi tunes. Two months later, in February 2021, Brodha V released "Aaraam", his second Kannada track. While speaking about "Aaraam" in an interview with Mid-Day, Brodha V stated that releasing songs in regional languages "lets him reach out to new listeners". Following an injury that set him back during the pandemic, Brodha V released All Divine that features Malayalam lyrics in February 2022. The song features Steve Knight from Flipsyde and the lyrics focus on Brodha V's "past mental health struggles, the pandemic-enforced isolation and most recently, a torn ligament." In August 2022, Brodha V released Bujjima that features Niharika NM in the music video. In September 2022, Brodha V collaborated with KR$NA and released the much awaited track "Forever" where the two lyrical rappers showcased their penmanship. Following the success of Vainko, Brodha V collaborated with comedic duo Jordindian again in 2023 to release "Basti Bounce" which is touted as the successor for Vainko.

Etymology behind the stage name 
Brodha V revealed in an interview to Raaj Jones that his stage name, Brodha V is derived from two elements, the first fragment stands for brotherhood while the second stands for his given name, Vighnesh.

Musical style 
Brodha V's style is a blend of hip-hop, Hindustani classical, Carnatic classical and Indian folk music. Most of his work is delivered in common language, drawn from his own personal experiences.

Influences  
Brodha V cites the song "Pettai Rap", composed by A. R. Rahman for the Tamil film Kadhalan, as his introduction to rap music. He also cites early '90s East coast rappers  Eminem, Rakim, Nas, Big Pun, Wu-Tang Clan and Jay-Z as his inspiration and role models.

Discography

Singles & collaborations

Film music

Awards and nominations 
 Radio City Freedom Awards 2013: Best Hip Hop/Rap Artist – ("Indian Flava") – Winner (Judge's Choice Award)
 Radio City Freedom Awards 2014: Best Hip Hop/Rap Artist – ("After Party") – Nominated
 Vh1 Sound Nation Awards 2014 – Best Hip Hop Act – Nominated
 Radio City Freedom Awards 2015: Best Hip Hop/Rap Artist – (Indian Rap Cypher/"Aigiri Nandini") – Nominated
 GIMA 2015: Best Music Debut Non-Film ("Aigiri Nandini") – Nominated
 Renault Free the Music Award 2015 for Contribution to Independent Music – Winner
Radio City Freedom Awards 2016 : Best Indie Collaboration of the Year – ("Round Round") – Nominated
Radio City Freedom Awards 2018: Best Hip Hop Artist of the Year (Jury Award)- Let em Talk
Radio City Freedom Awards 2018: Best Hip Hop Artist of the Year (Jury Award)- Way Too Easy

References 

Indian rappers
1990 births
Living people
People from Kanchipuram district
Musicians from Bangalore
Bishop Cotton Boys' School alumni